John Kearney (August 31, 1924 – August 10, 2014) was an American artist, best known for his sculptures made of car bumpers. During his career, Kearney was based out of Chicago and Provincetown, Massachusetts. Many of his sculptures are displayed outside of public buildings.

Life

Kearney received his artistic education at the Cranbrook Academy of Art in Bloomfield Hills, Michigan, and the Universita per Stranieri in Perugia, Italy. In 1950, he co-founded the Contemporary Art Workshop in Chicago. Subsequently, he lived and worked in Italy numerous times, most notably in Rome in 1963 and 1964 while on a Fulbright Award, and in 1985 and 1992 while serving as a visiting artist at the American Academy in Rome.

Kearney learned his welding skills as a World War II U.S. Navy sailor while performing underwater repair of naval vessels.

Awards
 Fulbright Award to Rome in 1963–64
 Italian Government Grant in 1963–64
 Visiting Artists at America Academy in Rome, 1985 and 1992

Collections that own Kearney's work

 Aon (Standard Oil Building) in Chicago
 Detroit Children's Museum
 Illinois State Capitol Visitors Center, Springfield, Illinois
 Springfield Art Association, Springfield, Illinois 
 Mitchell Museum, Mt. Vernon, Illinois
 Museum of Contemporary Art, Chicago
 Ulrich Museum, Wichita, Kansas
 Rockford Art Museum, Rockford, Illinois
 Canton Museum of Art, Canton, Ohio

Solo exhibitions
 New York City at A.C.A. Gallery, 1964 to 1979
 Berta Walker Gallery, Provincetown, Massachusetts, 1992 to 1997

Outdoor sculpture
In Chicago area

 Academy of Science (T. rex)
 Aon (formerly the Amoco Building and the Standard Oil Building) (three deer)
 Chicago Park District (two life size Horses)
 Clark and Deming intersection (two goats)
 Roscoe and Elaine Place intersection (two giraffes)(removed)
 Cornelia and Elaine Place intersection ("Nanny Goat") (removed)
 Field Museum, South Entrance (two bronzes)
 Field Museum, penguin and deer inside an exhibit.
 Francis Parker School
 Goudy School (double life-size cougar – the School Mascot)
 Lincoln Park Zoo (chromium-plated bull elephant) – the zoo did not take proper care of these sculptures, and they were removed due to damage.
 McCormick Seminary, Hyde Park, on University Avenue north of 55th Street (a large ram, named "Herald", pun referring to the Hyde Park Herald newspaper)
 Michigan Avenue Magnificent Mile (moose)
 Museum of Science and Industry (life-size gorilla)
 Oakton Community College
 Oz Park (the Tin Man (1995), Cowardly Lion (2001), Scarecrow (2005), and Dorothy and Toto (2007) from The Wizard of Oz)
 Sedgwick, 1800 block (two horses)
 Uptown Hull House (gorilla)
 Andersonville Residence (life-size Kodiak bear)

Elsewhere
 Dallas Museum of Natural History, Dallas, Texas, and Ripley's Believe It or Not! Museum, Grand Prairie, Texas (Chromosaurs:  Tyrannosaurus rex, Stegosaurus, and Triceratops)
 Boys and Girls Club of Fayetteville, Arkansas (life-size giraffe and gorilla)
 Mitchell Museum, Mt. Vernon, Illinois (one horse)
 Ulrich Museum, Wichita State University, Kansas (Grandfather's Horse)
 Delano Park, Delano, Wichita, Kansas on the  Chisholm Trail (one of Two Steers)
 Maize South High School, Maize Kansas (one of Two Steers)
 Hudson Welding and Fabricating, 326 St. Paul Street, St. Catharines, Ontario, Canada (life sized giraffe known locally as Gerry)
   RAM's Charles A. Wustum Museum of Fine Arts, 2519 Northwestern Ave, Racine, Wi, 53403 two giraffes, a pelican (1960), two goats (Goat 1978 and Nanny Goat 1999), and a standing female nude (Venus of Detroit 1975), are installed outdoors on the grounds at Wustum through August 12, 2021.
 Signal Centers (Chattanooga TN) Front of Facility (Horse) - www.signalcenters.org

References

External links
 Contemporary Arts Workshop
 Location of Outdoor Sculpture in Chicago
 Longer review at Berta Walker Gallery
 List of outdoor sculptures on Anatomically Correct
 Chicago Tribune article on the Goudy School sculpture
 Kimball the Horse, located at the Mitchell Museum, Mt. Vernon, Illinois
 History of "Herald [sic] the Ram" at McCormick seminary
 Another version of "Herald [sic] the Ram"
 
 Herod, Doug. 2013. The long journey from eyesore to St. Catharines Landmark. St. Catharines Standard, October 4th. 2013.
 

1924 births
2014 deaths
Cranbrook Academy of Art alumni
Artists from Chicago
Sculptors from Illinois